The inaugural Women's Boat Race took place on 15 March 1927. The contest was between crews from the Universities of Oxford and Cambridge and  held on The Isis in Oxford.

Race
The Times reported that "large and hostile crowds gathered on the towpath", while The New York Times stated "a crowd of fully five thousand persons was on hand as a willing cheering section". The Cambridge crew wore "white jumpers and chocolate shorts and stockings" while Oxford sported "white and dark blue shorts".

The judges for the contest were T. H. Henn (representing Cambridge) and J. G. Geoffreys (representing Oxford).  Reports differ as to the judges' opinions on style: one suggests they failed to agree on a winner, another indicates that they deemed the style of each crew to be equal.  As a result, the judges based the result on speed: the race was won by Oxford in a time of 3 minutes 36 seconds, beating Cambridge by 15 seconds.  The next Women's Boat Race would take place two years later.

Crews

See also
The Boat Race 1927

References

External links
 Official website

Women's Boat Race
1927 in English sport
March 1927 sports events
Boat
Boat